Hypocalymma gardneri is a member of the family Myrtaceae endemic to Western Australia.

It blooms between August and September producing yellow flowers.

It is found along the west coast on sand plains and heathland areas in the Mid West and Wheatbelt regions of Western Australia where it grows in sandy lateritic soils.

References

gardneri
Endemic flora of Western Australia
Rosids of Western Australia
Vulnerable flora of Australia
Plants described in 2002
Taxa named by Gregory John Keighery
Taxa named by Arne Strid